Pekan Nanas (literally meaning Pineapple Town) is a town located in Pontian District, Johor, Malaysia famous for its Pineapple plantation industry. It was Malaysia's largest production base for pineapple planting area.

Tourist attractions
 The Pineapple Museum is a museum dedicated to the town's Pineapple plantation and processing industry. It was inaugurated by Johor Chief Minister Abdul Ghani Othman on 21 May 2002. Formerly under the Agricultural Department, the management of the museum was transferred to the Malaysian Pineapple Industry Board in March 2021. The museum exhibits collections, history and information on pineapple plantation industry, as well as products and tools for pineapple processing.
 Sinar Eco Resort is a resort located within the town's Oil Palm Estate.

Transportation

Road
The Skudai–Pontian Highway passes through the town. The town is accessible by bus from Larkin Sentral (MyBas Johor - T50 & Maju - 96) in Johor Bahru.

Politics 
 is part of the eponymous state constituency in Johor, Malaysia that is represented in the Johor State Legislative Assembly. Currently the state constituency was held by Tan Eng Meng from Barisan Nasional (MCA).

References

Pontian District
Towns in Johor